The 2013 Ford EcoBoost 300 was the 33rd and final stock car race of the 2013 NASCAR Nationwide Series and the 19th iteration of the event. The race was held on Saturday, November 16, in Homestead, Florida at Homestead–Miami Speedway, a  permanent oval-shaped racetrack. The race took the scheduled 200 laps to complete. At race's end, Brad Keselowski, driving for Penske Racing, would make a late-race charge on the restart with five to go to win his 27th career NASCAR Nationwide Series win and his seventh and final win of the season. To fill out the podium, Kyle Larson of Turner Scott Motorsports and Kyle Busch of Joe Gibbs Racing would finish second and third, respectively.

Meanwhile, Richard Childress Racing driver Austin Dillon would win the championship in a tight battle with Penske Racing driver Sam Hornish Jr., finishing within six spots of Hornish Jr., with Dillon finishing 12th and Hornish Jr. finishing eighth, securing Dillon's first championship by three points.

Background 

Homestead-Miami Speedway is a motor racing track located in Homestead, Florida. The track, which has several configurations, has promoted several series of racing, including NASCAR, the Verizon IndyCar Series, the Grand-Am Rolex Sports Car Series and the Championship Cup Series.

Since 2002, Homestead-Miami Speedway has hosted the final race of the season in all three of NASCAR's series: the Sprint Cup Series, Xfinity Series and Gander Outdoors Truck Series. Ford Motor Company sponsors all three of the season-ending races; the races have the names Ford EcoBoost 400, Ford EcoBoost 300 and Ford EcoBoost 200, respectively, and the weekend is marketed as Ford Championship Weekend. The Xfinity Series (then known as the Busch Series) has held its season-ending races at Homestead since 1995 and held it until 2020, when it was moved to Phoenix Raceway, along with NASCAR's other two series.

Entry list 

 (R) denotes rookie driver.
 (i) denotes driver who is ineligible for series driver points.

Practice

First practice 
The first practice session was held on Friday, November 16, at 10:00 AM EST, and would last for 50 minutes.

Second and final practice 
The second and final practice session, sometimes referred to as Happy Hour, was held on Friday, November 16, at 3:10 PM EST, and would last for an hour and 10 minutes.

Qualifying 
Qualifying was held on Saturday, November 16, at 1:05 PM EST. Each driver would have two laps to set a fastest time; the fastest of the two would count as their official qualifying lap.

Carl Long was the only driver to fail to qualify.

Full qualifying results

Race results

Standings after the race 

Drivers' Championship standings

Note: Only the first 10 positions are included for the driver standings.

References 

2013 NASCAR Nationwide Series
NASCAR races at Homestead-Miami Speedway
November 2013 sports events in the United States
2013 in sports in Florida